Nothobranchius steinforti is a species of killifish in the family Nothobranchiidae. It is endemic to Upper Wami River drainage, Tanzania.  Its natural habitat is intermittent freshwater marshes, pools and rice fields.
This species was described in 1977 by Rudolf Hans Wildekamp with the type locality given as "8 kilometers from Kimamba, Tanzania". The specific name honours the Dutch aquarist Theo Steinfort who helped collect the type and bred this species in captivity, making it available to other killifish hobbyists.

References

steinforti
Fish of Tanzania
Endemic fauna of Tanzania
Taxonomy articles created by Polbot
Fish described in 1977